PT Saraswathy (1935–2009) was a politician of the Anna Dravida Munnetra Kazhagam in Tamil Nadu. She served as the Minister of Social Welfare in MG Ramachandran's cabinet.

Early life
Born at Cheranmadevi in Tirunelveli district on 13 March 1935, PT Saraswathy attended the Lady Doak College, Madurai, from where she received her B.A. degree. Later she did a law course at the Madras Christian College.

Career
Saraswathy was a secretary of the Anna Dravida Munnetra Kazhagam (AIADMK) and contested the 1977 Tamil Nadu Legislative Assembly election from Tirumangalam constituency. She defeated the Indian National Congress's candidate and was elected to the Sixth Assembly of Tamil Nadu. Chief Minister MG Ramachandran appointed her the Minister of Social Welfare in his cabinet. She was a legal advisor to Foundation for Innovative Case work On Education Economy & Environment.

Personal life
Saraswathy died at her residence in Chennai in May 2009. Her body was discovered only after her neighbours noticed that her house had been locked since several days and called the police.

References

1935 births
2009 deaths
Tamil Nadu MLAs 1977–1980